Francisco Olazar (10 July 1885 – 21 September 1958) was an Argentine football player and coach. He played as a central midfielder.

At club level, Olazar spent his entire career playing for Racing Club, where he won eight Primera División league titles and eight National cups. He also played for and coached the Argentina national team, being the team coach at the 1930 FIFA World Cup.

Career 

Olazar was born in Quilmes. He first played at Club Mariano Moreno, a small institution in Avellaneda, Greater Buenos Aires. In 1908 he joined Racing Club, where he started playing at 4th. division.

Playing as central midfielder ("number 5") Olazar was part of the Racing Club team that became legendary for their playing style and success, winning seven consecutive Primera División titles from 1913 to 1919, a landmark that still is a record in Argentine football and originated the Academy nickname for Racing Club that has identified the institution since then. Racing Club is considered successor of another legendary team, Alumni (dissolved in 1911), the most winning team of the first years of organised football in the country.

Olazar was one of the Racing Club most notable players because of his technique and his strength to recover the ball. He also captained the team during all those successful years. He scored a total of 37 goals playing for Racing Club.

As a key player of the Racing Club that won seven consecutive Primera División championships, Olazar was regarded as the best Argentine centre-half in those years. He was idolised by Racing Club supporters, and often compared with Uruguayan star José Piendibene, with whom he shared mutual respect.

He played for the Argentina national team on 18 occasions including appearances at the first two Copa América tournaments in 1916 and 1917.

After retiring as a player Olazar turned to coaching, and managed the Argentina team that won a Copa América trophy in 1929. He was also the coach of the team that took part of the first FIFA World Cup in 1930, where he and technical director Juan José Tramutola managed the albicelestes to second-place behind hosts Uruguay.

Honours

Player
Racing Club
 Primera División: 1913, 1914, 1915, 1916, 1917, 1918, 1919, 1921
 Copa de Honor: 1912, 1913, 1915, 1917
 Copa Ibarguren: 1913, 1916, 1917, 1918

Coach
Argentina
 Copa América: 1929
 1930 FIFA World Cup: runner-up

References

1885 births
1958 deaths
People from Quilmes
Association football midfielders
Argentine footballers
Argentina international footballers
Argentine Primera División players
Racing Club de Avellaneda footballers
Argentine football managers
1930 FIFA World Cup managers
Sportspeople from Buenos Aires Province